Erinocarpus is a genus of flowering plants belonging to the family Malvaceae.

Its native range is Southwestern India.

Species:
 Erinocarpus nimmonii J.Graham

References

Grewioideae
Malvaceae genera